The 2020–21 season was the 96th season in existence of Olympiacos and the club's 62nd consecutive season in the top flight of Greek football. The season was affected by the COVID-19 pandemic and all Olympiacos' games were played behind closed doors. Olympiacos participated in the Greek Super League winning their 46th title, finishing 26 points ahead of PAOK who came second. Domestically the team participated in the Greek Football Cup as well. They reached the final where they lost to PAOK. Olympiacos qualified also for the UEFA Champions League group stage for a second consecutive season but failed to qualify to the knock-out phase. Having finished third in their group, they were then transferred to UEFA Europa League knockout phase. The season covers the period from 20 August 2020 to 22 May 2021.

Players

First team

Out on loan

Backroom staff

Coaching staff

Transfers

In

 Total Spending: €10.40M

Out

 Total Income: €21.95M

Net Income:  €11.55M

Friendlies

Competitions

Overview

Super League Greece

League table

Results summary

Results by matchday

Regular season matches

Championship round matches

Greek Football Cup

Sixth round

Quarter-finals

Semi-finals 
The draw for the semi-finals was held on 16 March 2021.

Final

UEFA Champions League

Play-off round

Group stage

The group stage draw was held on 1 October 2020.

UEFA Europa League

Knockout phase

Round of 32
The round of 32 draw was held on 14 December 2020.

Round of 16
The round of 16 draw was held on 26 February 2021.

Squad statistics

Appearances

Goalscorers 

Own goals: 0

References

External links

Olympiacos F.C. seasons
Olympiacos
Olympiacos
Olympiacos
Greek football championship-winning seasons